

Major bridges

See also 

 Transport in the Republic of the Congo

References 
 Nicolas Janberg, Structurae.com, International Database for Civil and Structural Engineering

 Others references

Congo

b
Bridges